Didar Hajyýew (born December 1, 1980) is a Turkmen footballer playing currently in FC Ahal in Ýokary Liga . He is also a former member of Turkmenistan national football team

References

External links 
 

Living people
1980 births
Turkmenistan footballers
Turkmenistan international footballers
Expatriate footballers in Uzbekistan
Turkmenistan expatriate sportspeople in Uzbekistan
Navbahor Namangan players
Turkmenistan expatriate footballers
Association football midfielders